Robert Rollie Woolsey (August 14, 1888 – October 31, 1938) was an American stage and screen comedian and half of the 1930s comedy team Wheeler & Woolsey.

Early life 
Robert Rollie (sometimes spelled Rolla or even Raleigh) was born on August 14, 1888, in Carbondale, Illinois to James Monroe Woolsey and Sarah Eunice Woolsey (née Noble), both also born in Illinois. Woolsey, who had brown eyes and hair with a slight and slender build tried to capitalize on his size, as a young adult, by becoming a jockey. After he fell from a horse and sustained a fractured leg, he quit racing and turned instead to the vaudeville stage. In 1925 he was featured as "Mortimer Pottle" in W. C. Fields's Broadway hit Poppy.

Wheeler and Woolsey
Woolsey was teamed with comedy star Bert Wheeler in 1928, for the Broadway musical Rio Rita. RKO Radio Pictures filmed the play in 1929, launching Wheeler and Woolsey as movie personalities. Twenty-one of the twenty-two films Woolsey made were with his comedy partner, Wheeler.

Marriage
From 1921 to his death in 1938, Woolsey was married to Georgia girl Mignonne Park Reed, daughter of Mrs. Mary Reed also from Georgia.

Illness and death
Woolsey became terminally ill in 1936 and struggled to finish his last picture, High Flyers, which was released in 1937. His condition forced him to sever his working relationship with Wheeler. He was then confined to bed for almost a full year. He died on October 31, 1938, at age of 50 from kidney failure and cerebral malaria. Woolsey was interred in the Forest Lawn Memorial Park Cemetery in Glendale, California.

Filmography
(As per the AFI database)

DVD releases 
Nine of Wheeler and Woolsey's 21 movies were released in a DVD collection entitled "Wheeler & Woolsey: RKO Comedy Classics Collection" in March 2013 by Warner Archive.

{U.S. Census Records indicate he was born in Carbondale, Jackson Co, IL}

References

External links

 
 Wheeler & Woolsey
 Wheeler & Woolsey Fan Site
 
 Literature on Robert Woolsey

1888 births
1938 deaths
Vaudeville performers
Deaths from kidney failure
Male actors from Oakland, California
Burials at Forest Lawn Memorial Park (Glendale)
RKO Pictures contract players
American male film actors
20th-century American male actors
Comedians from California
20th-century American comedians